Sergeant Savely Govorkov (nicknamed Furious, also called Sergei (Rex) Govorkov in films) is a fictional character featuring in novels by Victor Dotsenko and others in the Soviet Union. A breakout character, Govorkov was created by Victor Dotsenko in the 1980s and by 1995 had featured in a number of novels by Dotsenko, making Dotsenko the most published and highest paid Russian writer. He appeared in more than twenty novels, all of them became a bestsellers. Other writers who have prominently featured the character in their works include Yuri Nikitin, Anton Pervushin, Valery Roschin, Kirill Vorobyev.

In the films portraying the character, his name was changed from the unusual Russian name "Savely" to the more common and catchy "Sergie". In the 1992 Soviet action/adventure film Terminate the Thirtieth!, based on the book by the same name, the character is played by Igor Livanov.

Short description
Savely Govorkov is a fictional character who squares off against the mafia, criminals, corrupt politicians, Chechen terrorists, and foreign enemies, saving President Yeltsin and receiving a Purple Heart from US authorities. A veteran of the Afghan war, he is almost superheroic in his approach, often compared to 
Rambo.

Further reading 

 Eliot Borenstein "Overkill: sex and violence in contemporary Russian popular culture". Ithaca : Cornell University Press, 2008 - 265 p. , 
 Michael L. Bressler "Understanding contemporary Russia". Boulder : Lynne Rienner Publishers, 2009 - 423 p. ,  (Page 371)
 Anna Brodsky, Mark Naumovich Lipovetskiĭ, Marina Kanevskaya, Sven Spieker "The imprints of terror: the rhetoric of violence and the violence of rhetoric in modern Russian culture". Gesellschaft zur Förderung slawistischer Studien, 2006 - 290 p. ,  (Page 121)
 Anthony Olcott "Russian pulp: the detektiv and the Russian way of crime". Lanham : Rowman & Littlefield, 2001 - 207 p. ,  (Pages 33,145,191,202)
 "Russian studies in literature", vol. 36. Periodical. Armonk, NY : M.E. Sharpe, Inc., 2000. 
 "The Soviet and post-Soviet review", vol. 29. Periodical. Salt Lake City, UT : College of Humanities, University of Utah, 2002.

References 

Fictional sergeants
Fictional Spetsnaz personnel
Fictional Soviet–Afghan War veterans
Fictional mercenaries
Fictional private military members
Characters in Russian novels of the 20th century
Fictional Russian people in literature
Fictional Soviet people